Adams Synchronological Chart or Map of History, originally published as Chronological Chart of Ancient, Modern and Biblical History is a synchronological wallchart and timeline ("timechart") that graphically depicts the history of humanity from 4004 BC (dated as the creation of the world by young Earth creationists) to modern times.
The chart is based on the mainstream Christian Bible, thus a chronological history of the stories told in the Bible is presented on its first pages, that eventually merges with secular history on the pages following.

The original version by Presbyterian missionary Sebastian C. Adams was published in 1871 and spanned to his present day in the 19th century. The chart has been later updated to continue up to the 21st century.

Format and design
The chart maintains a Victorian design (even in updated versions) and is thoroughly accompanied by illustrations.

As indicators of time, all through is the chart divided into big black posts which mark centuries and thin red lines which mark decades (with very thin red lines occasionally marking single years).

Additionally, big red crosses indicate great persecutions of Christians at the times of the Roman Empire and small red crosses stand for each of the crusades. Red circles indicate ecumenical councils. Also, question marks indicate uncertainties (they are mostly seen at the beginning of the timechart, where the certainty of events and the accuracy of dates are most disputed).

The nation streams are segmented into different colours, each colour indicating the reign of a particular ruler or a certain type of government. In some cases, prime ministers are shown in the lower half of nation streams and presidents in the upper half. Coloured scrolls and strips near the top of the chart stand for important people other than the rulers and other political leaders shown on the nation streams. These streams grow wider or thinner in accordance to historical context. Some streams divide to indicate a split in the nation (e.g. to indicate the independence of a state) or flow into others to illustrate its conquest, invasion, or acquisition by such other nation.

Suzi Feay of The Independent describes the chart's peculiar design for a peculiarly big scope of human history as something that "resembles an unusually complicated digestive system, with its lines, loops, bulges and branches."

Content
The chart begins with Adam and Eve and advances with their genealogy. After depicting Noah's flood as described in Genesis (which is indicated by a black line), the chart is divided in two: the upper part continuing with the genealogy and the lower broader part showing the origin of the first nations as people supposedly separated because of the confusion of tongues following the construction of the Tower of Babel. The link between the genealogy upwards and the nation streams downwards is presented by recognizing the founders of each nation as specific people from the genealogy, in accordance with certain interpretations of The Bible.

At certain points of the chart, large percentages of space are occupied by big empires such as the Babylonian Empire (under the reign of Nebuchadnezzar II), the Persian Empire, the Macedonian Empire, and the Roman Empire, which, at one page, occupies almost the entire part of the chart used for nation streams. At the fall of Rome, the empire's colossal nation stream is divided into many smaller streams of Barbaric Kingdoms. As history advances, the nation streams, being first wavy, gradually straighten up. The independence of many colonies is clearly shown as big nation streams standing for colonial empires split into several smaller streams. World War I and World War II are indicated by bold black lines behind the streams with a thickness determined by their duration.

Image of the 1881 edition

References

External links
 Sebastian C. Adams (artist)
 Interactive version of Adams Synchronological Chart at TheBibleSays.com
 

1890 works
19th-century prints
Historical timelines